Bombed Out is Angelic Upstarts's ninth album, released in 1992.

Track listing
All tracks composed by Thomas Mensforth and Ray Cowie

Side A
"Red till Death"
"Albert's Got a Gun"
"Victim of Deceit"
"Open Your Eyes"
"Still Fighting"

Side B''
"The Writing On the Wall"
"A Real Rain"
"Let's Build a Bomb"
"Loud & Proud"
"Stone Faced Killer"

Personnel
Angelic Upstarts
Thomas "Mensi" Mensforth - vocals
Ray "Mond" Cowie - guitar, vocals
Dave Brewis - bass
Graham Lant - drums
Derek "Decca" Wade - drums on "Open Your Eyes" and "Stone Faced Killer"
Pervie Knox - backing vocals

References

1992 albums
Angelic Upstarts albums